Usha Ananthasubramanian is the former managing director and chief executive officer of the Allahabad Bank,

Education and early career
Ananthasubramanian holds a master's degree in statistics from the University of Madras and a master's degree in Ancient Indian culture from University of Mumbai

Her background in statistics helped her get her first job as a specialist in the actuarial department with Life Insurance Corporation (LIC), while her understanding of Ancient Indian Culture gave her a deeper insight into understanding risk. She was charged by the CBI for the Nirav Modi fraud case during her tenure at PNB

Career in banking
Ananthasubramanian started her career in banking in February 1982, when she joined the Bank of Baroda as a specialist officer in its planning stream.

Prior to joining Bhartiya Mahila Bank, Ananthasubramanian worked at Punjab National Bank and was recognised in the following roles:
 Executive director
 Member of share transfer committee
 Member of audit committee
 Member of Committee of Directors to Review Disposal of Vigilance/ Non-Vigilance Disciplinary Action Cases
 Member of customer service committee
 Member of information technology committee
 Member of management committee
 Member of power of attorney committee
 Member of risk management committee
 Member of shareholders/investors grievance committee
 Member of special committee of board

She served as MD of Punjab National Bank between August 2015 and May 2017. Prior to that, she served as CEO of Allahabad Bank.

She was ranked the 19th Most Powerful Woman in business by Fortune India First women CHAIRMAN of IBA

Bhartiya Mahila Bank
With a banking career spanning over 31 years, Ananthasubramanian was nominated in 2013 as leader of the core management team constituted by the Ministry of Finance (India) during UPA rule for coordinating the process of establishment of the Women's Bank (Bhartiya Mahila Bank)

Punjab National Bank Scam
Ananthasubramanian was named in CBI chargesheet in association with Punjab National Bank Scam, relating to fraudulent Letters of Undertaking issued to Nirav Modi. CBI alleges that key PNB bank officials, led by then CEO Ananthasubramanian, failed to initiate steps that could have prevented the $2-billion fraud at the lender after the banking watchdog RBI had red-flagged likely gaps in systems controls. It adds that the RBI had instructed that while acknowledging the Caution Advice, they should report the occurrence of such incidents at their banks. If no such incident was observed, a NIL statement should be furnished. RBI revealed that PNB,  had not responded to the said caution advice until February 2018, when the fraud came to light. Ananthasubramanian was the MD of PNB when the caution advice was issued.

On 20 August 2018, Usha Ananthasubramanian was granted bail on a surety bond of Rs 1 lakhs by Special CBI court in Mumbai. A week earlier, the government had dismissed Usha on the last day of her work. She was dismissed with immediate effect.

See also

References

1960 births
Living people
Indian women bankers
Indian chairpersons of corporations
Indian women chief executives
Indian chief executives
University of Madras alumni
University of Mumbai alumni
Businesspeople from Allahabad
Businesswomen from Uttar Pradesh
Punjab National Bank